James Patrick Healey (born 13 January 1951 in County Galway, Republic of Ireland) is an Irish-born Australian actor.

Early life
His family moved to Manchester, England before emigrating to Melbourne, Australia in 1970. He studied acting at both NIDA (Sydney) and RADA (London).

Career
In Australia he acted in television police procedural Homicide in guest roles in 1975 and 1976.

George Miller's first choice for the starring role of Max Rockatansky was Healey himself whom at the time worked at a Melbourne abattoir, while pursuing his theatrical film debut. Upon reading the script of Mad Max (1979) given to him, Healey declined the role of the strong but taciturn character, finding the lead's meager and terse dialogue too unappealing for his vocal acting performance. The American up-and-coming young actor Mel Gibson then served as Healey's starring replacement for the role of Max.

During the release of Mad Max 2 in theaters, Healey on the other hand had a regular role on the soap opera The Restless Years as the murderous villain Gary Fisher in 1981.

He also appeared in Sons and Daughters for two episodes, as Wayne Hamilton's best man, in 1983. 

On American television he appeared on the soap opera Dynasty as Sean Rowan. He appeared in the show throughout the 1987–88 season, during which time his character became the fourth husband of Alexis Carrington Colby, played by Joan Collins after saving her life following a car crash. 

After that he had a regular role on daytime serial Santa Barbara in 1990.

Arrest
In 1993, Healey was convicted of assault with a deadly weapon, and sentenced to 200 hours of community service and three years' probation upon suspension of a two-year state prison term. His acting career ended in 1996.

References

External links
 

Living people
Irish emigrants to Australia
Australian male television actors
Place of birth missing (living people)
Alumni of RADA
1951 births
Irish expatriates in the United Kingdom

Male actors from County Galway
Male actors from Melbourne